In enzymology, a N-methyl-L-amino-acid oxidase is an enzyme that catalyzes the chemical reaction

an N-methyl-L-amino acid + H2O + O2  an L-amino acid + formaldehyde + H2O2

The 3 substrates of this enzyme are N-methyl-L-amino acid, H2O, and O2, whereas its 3 products are L-amino acid, formaldehyde, and H2O2.

It has 2 cofactors: FAD,  and Flavoprotein.

Nomenclature 

This enzyme belongs to the family of oxidoreductases, specifically those acting on the CH-NH group of donors with oxygen as acceptor.  The systematic name of this enzyme class is N-methyl-L-amino-acid:oxygen oxidoreductase (demethylating). Other names in common use include N-methylamino acid oxidase, and demethylase.

References

Further reading 
 
 
 

EC 1.5.3
Flavoproteins
Enzymes of unknown structure